King Abdulaziz Foundation for Research and Archives (KAFRA), better known as Darah, is a cultural institution in the al-Murabba neighborhood of Riyadh, Saudi Arabia, located in middle of the Murabba Palace compound and the National Museum. It includes the King Abdulaziz Memorial Hall and King Abdulaziz Private Library. Established in September 1972 through a royal decree by King Faisal, it was later included in the King Abdulaziz Historical Center in 1999.

The Darah mainly involves in collections management and preservation of documents and archives pertaining to King Abdulaziz, the first monarch of Saudi Arabia, his successors and the national history in general.

References 

Cultural organisations based in Saudi Arabia
Organizations established in 1972